Charles McKee (born March 14, 1962) is an American sailor and Olympic medalist. 

He won the ICSA Match Racing National Championship in 1985 with the University of Washington.

He competed in the 470 class at the 1988 Summer Olympics in Seoul and received a bronze medal.

He competed in the 49er class at the 2000 Summer Olympics in Sydney together with his brother Jonathan McKee, and they won the bronze medal.

McKee and his brother sailed for OneWorld in the 2003 Louis Vuitton Cup and for Luna Rossa Challenge in the 2007 Louis Vuitton Cup.

References

External links
 
 
 

American male sailors (sport)
Sailors at the 1988 Summer Olympics – 470
Sailors at the 2000 Summer Olympics – 49er
Olympic bronze medalists for the United States in sailing
1962 births
Living people
49er class world champions
Medalists at the 2000 Summer Olympics
Medalists at the 1988 Summer Olympics
Luna Rossa Challenge sailors
2007 America's Cup sailors
2003 America's Cup sailors
World champions in sailing for the United States
Washington Huskies sailors